Diego Comin is a professor of economics at Dartmouth College.

Background and research 
Comin's research focuses on  macroeconomics, technology, and innovation economics. He has written on the effects of technology shifts and whether they act to challenge economic disparities, or only exacerbate existing wealth divisions.

His research has been published in a number of top economic journals such as the American Economic Review.  The New York Times, The Wall Street Journal and The Boston Globe have all featured his commentary or work.  In addition to teaching undergraduate courses, he is a Research Fellow at the Center for Economic Policy Research and a Faculty Research Fellow for the NBER. Comin is also a fellow for the Institute of New Economic Thinking.

From 2013-15, Comin advised the prime minister of Malaysia on the country's development strategy and cofounded the Malaysian Public-Private Research Network. He has recently served as a consultant to Microsoft.

Comin previously served as an associate professor of business administration at Harvard Business School, where he won the Apgar Prize for Innovation in Teaching, from 2007-2014.  He was an assistant professor of economics at New York University from 2000-2007.

Education
Comin graduated from Universitat Pompeu Fabra in 1995 with a B.A. in economics and from Harvard University in 2000 with a Ph.D. and M.A. in economics.

References 

Dartmouth College faculty
Harvard Graduate School of Arts and Sciences alumni
Living people
Year of birth missing (living people)
Pompeu Fabra University alumni